Anwar M. El-Khalil (born 9 March 1938) is a Druze Lebanese politician and former member of the Lebanese Parliament representing the Marjeyoun-Hasbaya district.

Early life and education
Anwar M. El-Khalil was born on 9 March 1938 in Lagos, Nigeria. He graduated from the International College-IC (Secondary School-1953) and from the American University of Beirut (1956). He got post graduate studies in London, UCL (1959) and a Barrister-at-Law – Member of the Honorable Society of the Middle Temple – London.

Career
Anwar M. El-Khalil owns and Chairs a number of companies in Lebanon and abroad
 Chairman of M. El-Khalil Transport Ltd., Nigeria
 Chairman of M. El-Khalil & Sons (Properties) Ltd., Nigeria
 Chairman of Seven-Up Bottling Co., Nigeria 1960 to 1990
 Managing Director of Beirut Riyadh Bank s.a.l. 1972 to 1995
 Chairman – General Manager of Beirut Riyadh Bank s.a.l. 1995 to 2002
 Chairman – General Manager of Arabian Touristic and Real Estate Co Ltd. (ATRICO) Beirut, Lebanon
 Member of the Board of Directors of Bank of Beirut s.a.l from 2003 to present
 Chairman of MAK Holdings (Lebanon) s.a.l since 2004 to present
 Chairman of Continental Beverages s.a.l (Holding) since 2006 to present
 Chairman of Continental Beverages s.a.l (Offshore) since 2007 to present
 Chairman of MAK Holdings Ltd. Since 2008 to present

Political life
 Member of Lebanese Parliament from 1991 to present
 Minister of State for Parliamentary Affairs 1992 to 1995
 Minister of State for Administrative Reform 1995 to 1996
 Minister of Information 1998 to 2000
 Minister of the Displaced 1998 to 2000

Member of:
 Parliamentary Committee of Defense, Internal Affairs and Municipalities
 Parliamentary Committee of Budget and Finance Committee.
 Parliamentary Committee of Women and Children
 Parliamentary Committee of Administration and Justice

Lebanese Parliamentary Committees:  Chairman Of:
 Lebanese-Swiss Friendship Parliamentary Committee
 Lebanese-Argentinian Friendship Parliamentary Committee
 Lebanese-Nigerian Friendship Parliamentary Committee
Member Of:
 Lebanese-Spanish Friendship Parliamentary Committee
 Lebanese-Swedish Friendship Parliamentary Committee
 Lebanese-European Friendship Parliamentary Committee

Other activities
 Founder of the Lebanese Community School Nigeria and president of its board of trustees
 President of "World Lebanese Cultural Union" 1971 to 1973
 Member of the Board of Directors of Chamber of Commerce & Industry, Beirut 1973 to 1979
 Deputy Chairman of the Board of Trustees of the Druze Community Health Foundation
 President of Union of Arab Banks 1983 to 1989 (an association of all banks in the Arab World)
 President of the Union of Arab Banks 1983 to 1989
 Honorary President for life of El-Khalil Foundation since 2003
 Founder and Chairman of the Arab Institute for Banking studies (Amman)

Honours
 Holder of the Lebanese Government National Cedar Medal – Commander Rank – 1974
 Holder of the Kingdom of Spain Royal decoration – 2011

Personal life
Married to Layla Zayd Al-Atrash in 1961 with four sons: Imad (Born 1963), Ziad (Born 1964), Fadi (Born 1969) and Naji (Born 1972).

See also
 Lebanese Parliament
 Members of the 2009-2013 Lebanese Parliament

References

1938 births
Living people
Members of the Parliament of Lebanon
Lebanese Druze
Government ministers of Lebanon
Information ministers
Alumni of the University of London
Amal Movement politicians